

Werferth was an English bishop of Worcester.

Werferth was consecrated either in 872 or between 869 and 872. A contemporary and friend of Alfred the Great, he was a significant translator, from Latin into Old English. His translations include the Dialogues of Gregory, commissioned by Alfred. He died either in 915 or between 907 and 915.

Notes

Citations

References
 Alfred and the Old English Prose of his Reign accessed on 6 September 2007

External links
 

Bishops of Worcester
English translators
9th-century English bishops
10th-century English bishops
9th-century translators
9th-century English writers